Júliusi éjszaka is a Hungarian play, written by Sándor Hunyady. It was first produced in 1929.

Hungarian plays
1929 plays